Hovhannes Harutyuni Abelian (October 23, 1865, Shamakhi, Baku Governorate, Russian Empire - July 1, 1936, Yerevan, Soviet Armenia) was an Armenian actor, People's Artist of the Armenian SSR (1925).

Biography 
From 1882, he worked in Armenian and Russian theatres of Baku and Tiflis. In 1908, he became the founder of "Abelian-Armenian Theatral Group", realised artistic tours in different countries (Russia, Iran, Germany, France, USA). In 1925, Abelian entered to the Armenian State Theatre, played in cinema ("Namus", 1925). A realistic-style actor, he played more than 300 roles.

Sources

 Armenian Concise Encyclopedia, Ed. by acad. K. Khudaverdian, Yerevan, 1990, p. 11

External links

Ethnic Armenian male actors
Armenian male stage actors
Armenian male silent film actors
Armenian people from the Russian Empire
Soviet Armenians
1865 births
1936 deaths
People from Shamakhi
People from Baku Governorate
People's Artists of Armenia
Burials at the Komitas Pantheon
19th-century Armenian male actors